Beyond the Dar Al-Harb is a collection of three fantasy and science fiction stories by American writer Gordon R. Dickson.  It was first published by Tor Books in 1985.  The title story is original to this collection, and features "Red Jamie", a character from the Thieves World series previously in Dickson's collaborative novel Jamie the Red (1984) (written with Roland Green).  The others appeared in the magazine Worlds of Tomorrow and the anthology The Day the Sun Stood Still edited by Robert Silverberg.

Dar al-Harb is an Arabic term, meaning "house of war".

Contents

 "Beyond the Dar al-Harb"
 "On Messenger Mountain"
 "Things Which Are Caesar’s"

Sources

1985 short story collections
Short story collections by Gordon R. Dickson
Fantasy short story collections
Tor Books books